William Sheldon Schwob (March 15, 1927 – September 20, 2017) was a United States Coast Guard rear admiral. He served as Commander of the First Coast Guard District in Boston, Massachusetts. Schwob was born in Buffalo, New York. He retired in 1980.

References

1927 births
United States Coast Guard admirals
2017 deaths
Military personnel from Buffalo, New York